Wendell & Vinnie is an American television sitcom that aired on Nickelodeon from February 16, 2013, to September 22, 2013. The series stars Jerry Trainor and Buddy Handleson. The first official promo for the show was released on December 21, 2012. On August 15, 2013, the series was cancelled after one season.

Premise
Vinnie is the owner of a pop culture memorabilia store and lives in Los Angeles without a care in the world. After his brother and sister-in-law suddenly die six months before the setting of the show, Vinnie finds himself as the legal guardian of his wise-beyond-his-years nephew, Wendell. With a little help from Vinnie's sister, Wilma, and his next-door neighbor, Taryn, Vinnie gets the hang of being a parent. At the same time, Wendell finds himself trying to keep his immature uncle under control.

Cast and characters
 Jerry Trainor as Vinnie Bassett, the true child of the two. He even says in one episode, "I know what 12-year-old boys like 'cause I've been one for 20 years!" He runs a pop culture memorabilia business, and is fond of video games, comic books, and eating junk food. He realizes that he was given custody of Wendell because Wendell's parents wanted to give Vinnie a chance and knew that Wendell is making his way no matter where he lives.
 Buddy Handleson as Wendell Bassett, an intelligent 12-year-old who has a number of hobbies. His parents died six months before the events of the series, as a result, he lives with his uncle. He is stereotypically nerdy and does not have many friends. He enjoys magic tricks and homework (he even created a fictional student named Jeremy in order to get more homework).
 Nicole Sullivan as Wilma Bassett, Vinnie's older sister, Wendell's aunt, and personal injury attorney. She does not understand why Wendell's parents left Vinnie in charge and wants to be Wendell's legal guardian for herself. She often tries to get men to date her, even if it means she must be dishonest - as in pretending she went to the same high school as a man she was attracted to or using a fake profile picture on an online dating website and claiming to be Persian.
 Haley Strode as Taryn Kleinberg, the beautiful recently divorced new neighbor of Wendell and Vinnie and close friend of the two. She comes from Houston, Texas. Vinnie was originally attracted to her but she rejected him after Vinnie stopped asking her out he asks out someone else and she said yes. In the series finale, Taryn noticed that she loves Vinnie and shares a kiss with him but then Vinnie tells her that he's involved with someone else.
 Angelique Terrazas as Lacy, Wendell's best friend whom he met in detention. She threatened him at first, but then she revealed that she is not really mean, but just wanted to look tough in front of her friends. She sometimes gets Wendell into trouble—Wendell's grandfather considers her a bad influence - but Wendell still likes her. She enjoys eating corn dogs. It is revealed that Vinnie is in a scrapbook club with Lacy's grandmother.

Production
On August 2, 2012, Nick at Nite announced that Wendell & Vinnie had been picked up for 20 episodes. However, on February 7, 2013, it was announced that it would premiere on Nick instead. Writing and filming of Wendell & Vinnie began in late 2011/early 2012 at Warner Brothers Studios, and the show had its first official promo on December 21, 2012. It premiered on February 16, 2013.

Episodes
The series was canceled by Nickelodeon on August 15, 2013. After the cancellation, the final six episodes aired on Nick at Nite on Sunday nights.

International broadcast

Reception
Wendell & Vinnie received some mixed reviews. Common Sense Media gave the show 2out of 5stars, saying "Lackluster sitcom has mixed messages about parenting".

References

External links
 
 Common Sense Media Age-Appropriate review of Wendell and Vinnie

2010s American sitcoms
2013 American television series debuts
2013 American television series endings
English-language television shows
Nick at Nite original programming
Television duos
Television series about orphans
Television shows set in Los Angeles
Television series by Kapital Entertainment